The 2022 Praga Cup was the first season of the Praga Cup made up of a grid of Praga R1Ts. The season began at Silverstone on 12 March and conclude at Donington Park on 23 October.

Calendar

Teams and drivers

Results and standings

Scoring system 
Points are awarded to the top twenty classified finishers. The pole-sitter also receives one point, and one point is given to the driver who sets the fastest lap. Points are not awarded to invitation drivers.

Drivers' championship

Praga Cup

References 

Praga Cup